Glypican-6 is a protein that in humans is encoded by the GPC6 gene.

The glypicans comprise a family of glycosylphosphatidylinositol-anchored heparan sulfate proteoglycans. The glypicans have been implicated in the control of cell growth and division. Glypican 6 is a putative cell surface coreceptor for growth factors, extracellular matrix proteins, proteases and anti-proteases.

See also
 Glypican

References

Further reading

External links